Sense and Sensibility is a 1995 British period drama film directed by Ang Lee. Actress Emma Thompson wrote the screenplay, which is based on the 1811 novel of the same name by English author Jane Austen. Thompson and Kate Winslet starred as the Dashwood sisters among a large ensemble cast. Columbia Pictures, a Sony Pictures Entertainment subsidiary, produced and released the film. Sense and Sensibility was released to cinemas on 15 December 1995, and earned a total worldwide gross of $134,582,776. Based on 67 reviews from film critics, the review aggregator website Rotten Tomatoes has calculated Sense and Sensibilitys approval rating to be 97%, deeming it "certified fresh".

Sense and Sensibility garnered various accolades following its release, ranging from the main cast's performances to Thompson's screenwriting. The adaptation received seven Academy Award nominations including the Academy Award for Best Picture, though the sole win that night was for the Academy Award for Best Writing (Adapted Screenplay), the only time a person has earned Oscars for both acting and writing. Thompson's screenwriting collected a further eleven accolades, including those given by the Broadcast Film Critics Association, Golden Globe Awards, and London Critics Circle. At the 49th British Academy Film Awards, Sense and Sensibility garnered twelve BAFTA nominations, ultimately coming away with three awards including the BAFTA Award for Best Film; Thompson and Winslet won the BAFTA Award for Best Actress in a Leading Role and BAFTA Award for Best Actress in a Supporting Role, respectively.

The cast also received numerous acting accolades. In addition to her writing credit, Thompson was recognized for her performance, and earned seven nominations. Winslet was recognized in categories for both lead and supporting actress, for instance winning the Evening Standard Award for Best Actress as well as the Screen Actors Guild Award for Outstanding Performance by a Female Actor in a Supporting Role. Other than the Academy Awards, the overall film garnered numerous nominations, ultimately winning the Boston Society of Film Critics Award for Best Film, Broadcast Film Critics Association Award for Best Film, and Golden Globe Award for Best Motion Picture – Drama, among other accolades. Sense and Sensibility received the most award recognition out of the many Austen adaptations of the 1990s. MaryAnn Johanson of Film.com named it the fifth best film of 1995.

Accolades 

 Each year is linked to the article about the awards held that year.

See also 

 1995 in film
 List of awards and nominations received by Emma Thompson

Notes

References

External links 
 

Lists of accolades by film